Marine 5 may refer to:
 Marine 5 (Rhode Island fireboat)
 The Marine 5: Battleground, a 2017 American film from The Marine franchise